This is a list of events in British radio during 2000.

Events

January
 18 January – Sitcom Revolting People opens on BBC Radio 4, set in colonial Baltimore, Maryland around the period of the American Revolutionary War and written by Andy Hamilton with the American Jay Tarses, with Tarses playing sour shopkeeper Samuel Oliphant and Hamilton playing cheerfully corrupt Sergeant Roy McGurk, billeted on him.

February
7 February – Plymouth Sound AM is re-branded Classic Gold 1152 (Plymouth).
9 February – Mike Harding presents highlights of the first annual BBC Radio 2 Folk Awards, which were awarded at London's Waldorf Hotel.
14 February – BBC Thames Valley FM closes because the station was not popular with listeners, resulting in the return of BBC Radio Berkshire and BBC Radio Oxford. Their programme schedules remain unchanged and most output continues to be shared.
17 February – Talk Radio UK is rebranded as talkSPORT.

March
10 March – Zoë Ball presents the Radio 1 Breakfast Show for the final time. Scott Mills begins a three-week stint as the show's temporary presenter.
14 March – Chris Evans sells his Ginger Media Group to SMG plc for £225m. The sale makes Evans the highest paid entertainer in the UK in 2000, estimated by the Sunday Times Rich List to have been paid around £35.5million.
25 March – BBC GLR changes its name to BBC London Live.
31 March – Katrina Leskanich presents her last night time show on BBC Radio 2.
March – Helen Boaden is appointed as controller of BBC Radio 4.

April
3 April – 
Sara Cox takes over as presenter of the Radio 1 Breakfast Show.
Janice Long begins presenting the night time show on Radio 2.

May
2 May – In Manchester, Lite AM is replaced by BIG 1458 AM.
17 May – Virgin Radio is fined £75,000 (the largest penalty imposed by the Radio Authority at this time) for breakfast show presenter Chris Evans's repeated on-air endorsement of Ken Livingstone in the London mayoral elections.
May – 
Capital Radio buys Border Radio Holdings, thereby acquiring the three Century radio stations.

June
No events.

July
10 July – Ten 17 changes its name to Ten 17 Mercury.
July –
Bob Shennan replaces Roger Mosey as Controller of BBC Radio 5 Live.
BBC Radio 3 hires Andy Kershaw to host a world music programme, two months after BBC Radio 1 axed his world music show.

August
 1 August – ITN launches ITN News Radio. It broadcasts nationally on the recently launched Digital One multiplex.
4 August – Radio 1 breakfast show presenter Sara Cox is reprimanded after saying live on air that Queen Elizabeth The Queen Mother "smelt of wee".

September
No events.

October
2 October – LBH Radio launches. Broadcasting on MW and Sky Digital, LBH is Britain's first radio station targeting the LGBT community.
21 October – The comedian Jack Docherty joins Radio 2 to host Saturday Night Jack, a 13-part series featuring music, reviews and interviews.

November
14 November – The audio relay on DAB of BBC Parliament closes.

December
4 December – FLR 107.3 changes its name to Fusion 107.3FM.
20 December – Following the death of singer Kirsty MacColl, Radio 2 have postponed a series she recorded about Cuban music that was due to begin airing on this day. The eight-part series, Kirsty MacColl's Cuba is instead broadcast from 31 January 2001.
26 December – Radio 4 clears its Boxing Day schedule in order to broadcast an eight-hour reading of Harry Potter and the Philosopher's Stone, read by Stephen Fry.

Station debuts
26 January – Q97.2
1 May – 106.3 Bridge FM
2 May – Oneword
3 May – Choice 107.1
29 May – Kick FM
26 June – The Groove
10 July – Argyll FM
25 July – 2BR
2 October – LBH Radio
3 October – Real Radio Wales
16 October – PrimeTime Radio
Unknown – Source FM

Closing this year
14 February – BBC Thames Valley FM (1996–2000)
28 September – Channel Travel Radio

Programme debuts
 January – The Big Booth on BBC Radio 4 (2000–2001)
 7 January – Dead Ringers on BBC Radio 4 (2000–2007, 2014–Present)
 18 January – Revolting People on BBC Radio 4 (2000–2006)
 February – BBC Radio 2 Folk Awards on BBC Radio 2 (2000–Present)
 March – The Hudson and Pepperdine Show on BBC Radio 4 (2000–2005)
 May – The Human Zoo on talkSPORT (2000–2002)
 3 May – Smelling of Roses on BBC Radio 4 (2000–2003)
 11 July – Ectoplasm on BBC Radio 4 (2000)
 3 August – Little Britain on BBC Radio 4 (2000–2002)
 31 August – Big John @ Breakfast on Hallam FM (2000–Present)
 21 October – Saturday Night Jack on BBC Radio 2 (2000–2001)
 19 December – Acropolis Now on BBC Radio 4 (2000–2002)
 Unknown – Sounds of the 70s with Steve Harley on BBC Radio 2 (2000–2008, 2009–Present)

Continuing radio programmes

1940s
 Sunday Half Hour (1940–2018)
 Desert Island Discs (1942–Present)
 Letter from America (1946–2004)
 Woman's Hour (1946–Present)
 A Book at Bedtime (1949–Present)

1950s
 The Archers (1950–Present)
 The Today Programme (1957–Present)
 Sing Something Simple (1959–2001)
 Your Hundred Best Tunes (1959–2007)

1960s
 Farming Today (1960–Present)
 In Touch (1961–Present)
 The World at One (1965–Present)
 The Official Chart (1967–Present)
 Just a Minute (1967–Present)
 The Living World (1968–Present)
 The Organist Entertains (1969–2018)

1970s
 PM (1970–Present)
 Start the Week (1970–Present)
 You and Yours (1970–Present)
 I'm Sorry I Haven't a Clue (1972–Present)
 Good Morning Scotland (1973–Present)
 Newsbeat (1973–Present)
 The News Huddlines (1975–2001)
 File on 4 (1977–Present)
 Money Box (1977–Present)
 The News Quiz (1977–Present)
 Feedback (1979–Present)
 The Food Programme (1979–Present)
 Science in Action (1979–Present)

1980s
 Steve Wright in the Afternoon (1981–1993, 1999–Present)
 In Business (1983–Present)
 Sounds of the 60s (1983–Present)
 Loose Ends (1986–Present)

1990s
 The Moral Maze (1990–Present)
 Essential Selection (1991–Present)
 No Commitments (1992–2007)
 The Pepsi Chart (1993–2002)
 Wake Up to Wogan (1993–2009)
 Essential Mix (1993–Present)
 Up All Night (1994–Present)
 Wake Up to Money (1994–Present)
 Private Passions (1995–Present)
 Parkinson's Sunday Supplement (1996–2007)
 The David Jacobs Collection (1996–2013)
 Westway (1997–2005)
 The 99p Challenge (1998–2004)
 Puzzle Panel (1998–2005)
 Drivetime with Johnnie Walker (1998–2006)
 Sunday Night at 10 (1998–2013)
 In Our Time (1998–Present)
 Material World (1998–Present)
 Scott Mills (1998–Present)
 The Now Show (1998–Present)
 The Attractive Young Rabbi (1999–2002)
 It's Been a Bad Week (1999–2006)
 Jonathan Ross'' (1999–2010)

Ending this year

Deaths
January 28 – Jean Metcalfe, 76, radio broadcaster
March 7 – Eileen Fowler, 93, fitness instructor
April 10 – Peter Jones, 79, comic actor
August 6 – Sir Robin Day, 76, political broadcaster

See also
 2000 in British music
 2000 in British television
 2000 in the United Kingdom
 List of British films of 2000

References

Radio
British Radio, 2000 In
Years in British radio